Downey Records was an American record label owned by Bill Wenzel (July 26, 1912 – November 20, 1999) in Downey, California, and distributed at times by Dot Records.

Wenzel worked as a sound engineer for MGM studios and in 1958, opened Wenzel's Music Town in Downey, California. In 1959, he began the Jack Bee label which he eventually turned into the Downey label with a studio in the back of the record store. Wenzel operated the store with his wife, his son and daughter-in-law. When they were not creating masters in the studio, the studio was rented out. Wenzel produced Downey Records at his studio and made dubs of out-of-stock songs upon request. When Wenzel retired from the business in the 1960s, his son Tom Wenzel (1935–2008) and Tom's wife Maxine continued running the shop.

The biggest hit on the label was the instrumental "Pipeline" by the Chantay's which peaked at No. 4 on the Billboard Hot 100 and No. 11 on the R&B chart in 1963. Singer-songwriter Barry White produced "Feel Aw Right" by the Bel Canto's on Downey Records in 1965, and released his first recordings under the name Lee Barry on the label in 1966. During the early 1960s, Downey was also producing records by The Rumblers, whose biggest hit "Boss" was leased to Dot Records, as well as "Pipeline", which had been leased around the same time.

In 2007, Big Beat Records released the compilation album It Came from the Garage! Nuggets from Southern California, compiled from Downey recordings.

Selected discography

References 

American record labels
Rhythm and blues record labels
Rock and roll record labels
Pop record labels
Record labels established in 1961
Record labels disestablished in 1967
Downey, California
Defunct record labels of the United States